Hexafluoro-2-butyne (HFB) is a fluorocarbon with the chemical structure CF3C≡CCF3.  HFB is a particularly electrophilic acetylene derivative, and hence a potent dienophile for Diels–Alder reactions.

HFB is prepared by the action of sulfur tetrafluoride on acetylenedicarboxylic acid or by the reaction of potassium fluoride (KF) with hexachlorobutadiene.

It reacts with sulfur to give 3,4-bis(trifluoromethyl)-1,2-dithiete.

References

Alkyne derivatives
Trifluoromethyl compounds
Fluorocarbons